Tatu Kokkola (born August 29, 1997) is a Finnish professional ice hockey player currently playing for Jokipojat in Mestis.

Kokkola previously played in Liiga for KalPa, making his debut during the 2016–17 Liiga season where he played two games. He then played two more games for KalPa the following season before joining IPK of Mestis on loan. On May 4, 2018, Kokkola signed for Jokipojat.

References

External links

1997 births
Living people
Finnish ice hockey centres
Iisalmen Peli-Karhut players
Jokipojat players
KalPa players
People from Suonenjoki
Sportspeople from North Savo